DEPT may refer to:
 Directed enzyme prodrug therapy
 Distortionless enhancement by polarization transfer